Youssef Badawy (Arabic: يوسف بدوي, born 6 August 2001) is an Egyptian karateka and a world-classed champion. He won the gold medal in the men's kumite 84 kg event at the 2021 World Karate Championships held in Dubai, United Arab Emirates. In 2019, he won the bronze medal in the men's kumite 84 kg event at the World Cadet, Junior & Under 21 Championships in Chile, marking his debut at the Worlds and introducing himself as a candidate for the World Champion title.

Early experience 
Inspired by his brother, who is also a kumite practitioner, Badawy took karate up at the age of five. He moved to Al Zohour Sporting Club and started making his way in the sport under his coach Mohamed Fathy by contending at the nationals. In 2015, he joined the Egyptian National Team. He made a start on participating internationally by enrolling in cadets’ kumite -63 kg event at Al-Ahli Dubai Open International Championship in 2016 and at The African Championship held in Algeria in 2018.

Career journey

Warm-up 
In February 2019, Badawy won his first continental gold medal at The African Championship in Marrakech, Morocco. A month later, he contended at The Arab Championship for Clubs, winning the bronze medal in the kumite team event. During the same year in May, he won the gold medal in the men’s kumite +76 kg event at the Karate1 Youth League held in Limassol, Cyprus, and, in August, he won the bronze medal in the men’s team kumite at The African Games held in Rabat, Morocco. A few months later, he was ready to vie for a medal at the Junior, Cadet and U21 World Karate Championship held in Santiago, Chile, at which he claimed his first world bronze medal.

In February 2020, before COVID-19 outbreak, he won the silver medal in the men’s team kumite event at the African Championship in Tangier, Morocco.

Preliminaries to a breakthrough 
 thumb|Badawy vs Nabil Ech-Chaabi at Moscow Karate1 Premier League final
In April 2021, after the hiatus foisted by the karate events suspension due to COVID, he made his first premier league participation for the season in Lisbon, Portugal. Badawy competed with Male Kumite -84 kg category’s best bets and swept the two premier leagues held at the thick of the season. He made his senior debut in September at Egypt’s Karate 1 Premier League with a gold medal, and at the premier league that followed in Moscow, he carried another gold medal back home after keeping a clean sheet throughout his five rounds. He promised on Instagram that it would not be the last gold medal.

World Karate Championship 2021: The breakthrough 
Badawy was one of the youngest contenders in the tournament. He started off with a win against Ivan Kvesić, one-time 2018 world champion, and upstaged renowned karate pros. At the semi-final bout, Badawy bumped heads with Jessie Da Costa who outmatched with a single point almost till the end. Badawy’s national team coach Mohamed Abdelrahman requested a VR at the 0:04 second which stalled the announcement of the bout end and provided Badawy with a final chance. Badawy signed off an emotive last-second Yuko to even the score 2-2 and win the bout by Senshu privilege.

The awaited moment 
After an indecisive final between Badawy and Fabián Huaiquimán, the bout ended with a score tie 6-6 and the nullification of Badawy’s Senshu. Badawy was proclaimed the winner by Hantei after a consensus among the five judges.

He stated that it was an exacting win and attributed his achievement to his family.

End season 
He was entitled vice champion at the African Championship held in December in his hometown, Cairo, Egypt. No more than a week later, Badawy competed in Algeria at the Arab Championship, at which he won the bronze medal at the men’s kumite 84 kg event, and the gold medal at the kumite team event.

Following after Dubai World Championship, in December, WKF announced the list of the first qualified athletes, which included Badawy the reigning world champion, for the Karate most anticipated event of the year: 2022 World Games which was held in July in Birmingham, United States. Following in January was Badawy’s ascent to the top 5 athletes in the world ranking for the Male Kumite -84 kg category.

Golden: Overture 
Badawy inaugurated his 2022 season medal count with a gold medal at the Fujairah Karate1 Premier League event after coming across his teammate, Mohamed Ramadan, at an all-Egypt final. In March, he went for playing for Al-Sharjah Sporting Club and placed first at the national Karate General League held in UAE.
 thumb|Fujairah premier league award ceremony
In May, Badawy made it to the first place in the world ranking of his category. Days later he welcomed another gold medal to his records at Rabat Karate1 Premier League.

Mediterranean Games 2022 
Outmatching his opponent at the Mediterranean Games semifinal, Badawy received a hard blow to the head that knocked him out for a few seconds. He resumed the bout to win with a 4-1 score despite his condition. He was then moved to the hospital for a checkup, and the Egyptian Olympic Committee stated that he will not play the final for the sake of his safety. Abdel Fattah al-Najjar, head coach of the Egyptian Karate team, confirmed that Badawy underwent a crying fit on being notified of his imminent official disqualification from the final match and surprised everyone by insisting on playing the final with a promise that the gold medal is Egypt's. He played at the final and won the gold medal with a 6-4 score.

World Games 2022 
Competing against the best seven players in the world, Badawy started off with a win against the Moroccan champion Nabil Ech-Chaabi then another one against the Dutchman champion Brian Timmermans to be qualified to vie against Ivan Kvesić in the semifinal. Badawy had to clash with Nabil Ech-Chaabi for a second time in the tournament at the final at which he pulled off a last-second victory by signing an offensive Yuko after the annulment of Ech-Chaabi's Senshu to balance the score 6-6 and win by Hantei.

In September, Badawy achieved the gold medal at the last premier league of the 2022 season which was held in Baku, Azerbijan. In October, Badawy played for Al Nassr Sporting Club at the national league for teams and placed 1st. For the finale of the 2022 season, Badawy seized the continental title of African Champion at The African Championship held in Durban, South Africa with a clean sheet throughout his four rounds and won the gold medal for the kumite team event as well.

Badawy had a rough start for the 2023 season as he had to sit out the Karate Premier League held in his hometown, Cairo, Egypt, because of his jaw injury. On January 7, two weeks before the Premier League, Badawy was competing at the Saudi national league when he received a hard blow in the face. He was diagnosed with a jaw dislocation and had to undergo a surgery, hindering his participation in any combat during his recovery period.

Personal life 
He is an engineering undergraduate studying at Ain Shams University and has majored in mechanical engineering.

Techniques and skills 
He is generally recognized by his on-target kicks and particularly by his known Ura mawashi, which he stated was his favorite move.

Achievements

Honors and awards 
In December 2019, he was bestowed the third-class Order of the Republic by Egypt's president Abdel Fattah Al-Sisi for winning his world bronze medal in Chile. The Faculty of Engineering of Ain Shams University honored him for sport excellence and his four international achievements in karate of the 2022 year.

References

External links 
 
 
 

Living people
2001 births
Place of birth missing (living people)
Egyptian male karateka
Competitors at the 2022 Mediterranean Games
Competitors at the 2022 World Games
World Games medalists in karate
World Games gold medalists
Mediterranean Games gold medalists for Egypt
Mediterranean Games medalists in karate
African Games medalists in karate
African Games bronze medalists for Egypt
Competitors at the 2019 African Games
21st-century Egyptian people